The Debs School is an historic rural schoolhouse that was built in 1926 in Hinsdale County, Colorado. It is located near Pagosa Springs, Colorado. It has also been known as Upper Piedra School, 5HN642, and the Debs Community Building.  It was listed on the National Register of Historic Places in 2005.

It is Hinsdale County's only surviving one-room schoolhouse. It was deemed significant for its architecture: its exterior walls are built of rock face ornamental concrete blocks, one of three identified schools in the state using that construction.  It was named for socialist labor leader Eugene Debs. It served as a school from 1926 to 1951; it also served as a meeting hall.

References 

Hinsdale County, Colorado
One-room schoolhouses in Colorado
School buildings on the National Register of Historic Places in Colorado
National Register of Historic Places in Hinsdale County, Colorado
School buildings completed in 1926
Eugene V. Debs
1926 establishments in Colorado
Ornamental block buildings